Quri Qaleh Rural District is a rural district (dehestan) in Shahu District, Ravansar County, Kermanshah Province, Iran. At the 2006 census, its population was 3,031, in 624 families. The rural district has 10 villages.

References 

Rural Districts of Kermanshah Province
Ravansar County